Alexander J. Napoli (October 7, 1905 – July 12, 1972) was a United States district judge of the United States District Court for the Northern District of Illinois.

Education and career

Born in Chicago, Illinois, Napoli received a Bachelor of Philosophy degree from the University of Chicago in 1927 and a Juris Doctor from the University of Chicago Law School in 1929. He was in private practice in Chicago from 1929 to 1933. He was an assistant state's attorney of Cook County, Illinois from 1933 to 1950. He was a judge of the Municipal Court of Chicago from 1950 to 1960, of the Superior Court of Cook County from 1960 to 1963, and of the Circuit Court of Cook County from 1964 to 1966.

Federal judicial service

On August 17, 1966, Napoli was nominated by President Lyndon B. Johnson to a new seat on the United States District Court for the Northern District of Illinois created by 80 Stat. 75. He was confirmed by the United States Senate on September 20, 1966, and received his commission on September 21, 1966, serving until his death in Chicago on July 12, 1972.

See also
List of first minority male lawyers and judges in Illinois

References

Sources
 

1905 births
1972 deaths
Judges of the Circuit Court of Cook County
Judges of the United States District Court for the Northern District of Illinois
United States district court judges appointed by Lyndon B. Johnson
20th-century American judges
20th-century American lawyers
American people of Italian descent
Judges of the Superior Court of Cook County